Anamaria Marinca (born 1 April 1978) is a Romanian actress. She made her screen debut with the Channel 4 film Sex Traffic, for which she won the British Academy Television Award for Best Actress. Marinca is also known for her performance in 4 Months, 3 Weeks and 2 Days, earning several awards for her performance, and was nominated for the European Film Award for Best Actress, London Film Critics Circle Award for Actress of the Year, Los Angeles Film Critics Association Award for Best Actress and National Society of Film Critics Award for Best Actress. In 2008, at the 58th Berlin International Film Festival, she was presented the Shooting Stars Award by the European Film Promotion.

Life and career 

Marinca was born in Iași, Romania. She grew up with a strong foundation in the arts. Her mother was a classically trained violinist while her father was a theatre professor at the university level. She studied the violin all throughout her childhood when, at around the age of seven, she had announced she wanted to become an actress.

Marinca graduated from the University of Fine Arts, Music and Drama "George Enescu" in Iași.

In 2005, she won three Best Actress Awards (the BAFTA Television Awards, the Royal Television Society Award and the 'Golden Nymph' at 45th ) for her role in Sex Traffic, a CBC/Channel 4 drama about human trafficking. As well as appearing on stage in Romanian theatre productions, she also acted in Measure for Measure at the National Theatre in London.

In 2007, she starred in the Romanian film  (4 Months, 3 Weeks and 2 Days) by Cristian Mungiu, which won the Palme d'Or at the 2007 Cannes Film Festival, and two other awards (the Cinema Prize of the French National Education System and the FIPRESCI Prize). She also appeared in the Francis Ford Coppola film Youth Without Youth. In 2008, she appeared as Yasim Anwar in the BBC 5-episode miniseries The Last Enemy. Marinca appeared in the Romanian drama Boogie and Oliver Hirschbiegel's acclaimed Five Minutes of Heaven. She later had a prominent role in the 2014 film Fury, in which she played a German woman named Irma who meets up with an American tank crew during World War II. She is a regular in the Welsh TV detective series Hinterland.

Filmography

Stage credits

Radio credits

Awards and nominations

See also 
 Romanian New Wave

References

External links 
 
 2008 interview in The Guardian
 2011 Interview

1978 births
Best Actress BAFTA Award (television) winners
Living people
Actors from Iași
Actresses from London
Romanian film actresses
Romanian stage actresses
Romanian television actresses
Romanian expatriates in England
21st-century Romanian actresses
George Enescu National University of Arts alumni
21st-century English women
21st-century English people